A documentation generator is a programming tool that generates software documentation intended for programmers (API documentation) or end users (end-user guide), or both, from a set of source code files, and in some cases, binary files. Some generators, such as Javadoc, can use special comments to drive the generation. Doxygen is an example of a generator that can use all of these methods.

Types of generation
Document generation can be divided in several types:

 Batch generation (generic technique)
 Text block correspondence (documents created based on pre-defined text blocks)
 Forms (forms for websites)
 Documentation synthesis:
 Documentation can be inferred from code
 Documentation can be inferred from execution traces

Some integrated development environments provide interactive access to documentation, code metadata, etc.

References

See also
 Comparison of documentation generators
 Template processor
 Static code analysis
 Literate programming
 Integrated development environment